Lourdes Reyes (born María Lourdes Reyes Barragán on June 15, 1972 in San Luis Potosí City, San Luis Potosí, Mexico) is a Mexican television actress and singer. She is the daughter of Jesus Reyes and Lourdes Barragan. Lourdes is active in television and social activism.

Biography 
Lourdes began her singing career in 1987, participating in a local musical group of San Luis Potosi. In 1991, she participated in Valores Juveniles Bacardi & Cia.

Career 
Lourdes television debut was in 1993, acting in some episodes of Televiteatros. She subsequently enters the Centro de Educación Artística de Televisa (CEA), where she graduated in 1994. In 1998, Lourdes is cast in the telenovela Camila, playing the character of 'Selene Olivares'. Later the same year, she appears in the melodrama Sin ti. A year later Lourdes joined the cast of  ¿Qué nos pasa? and the telenovela Por tu amor.

In 2000, Lourdes was called to appear in two telenovelas: Amigos x siempre and Por un beso. Between 2001 and 2004, she recorded more than 10 episodes of the series Mujer casos de la vida real. In 2003 Lourdes gave life to 'Rocio' in the children's telenovela De pocas, pocas pulgas. In 2004 she stars in the film comedy Dos tragedia, along actress Rosa Maria Bianchi. Sueños y caramelos (2005) is the soap opera in which Lourdes replaces Adriana Fonseca as 'Melissa' due to Fonseca being indiscipline. That same year, she also entered the cast of Piel de otoño, sharing credits with Laura Flores and Sergio Goyri. In 2006, Lourdes was part of the cast of the teen telenovela of the moment, Rebelde, where she played the role of the teacher 'Julia Lozano'. In January 2007, Lourdes ventured into the world of driving with the Metrópolis program, broadcast by 4TV, sharing credits with Laisha Wilkins and Verónica del Castillo, among others.

For 2008, Lourdes was called by producer, MaPat Lopez de Zatarain, to participate in the telenovela Juro que te amo, starring as the antagonistic couple next to Alexis Ayala. In 2011 Lourdes had a small role in the telenovela Ni contigo ni sin ti. In 2012, she joined the infamous series and at the end enlivens Ilse in La mujer de Vendaval. Lourdes also participated in the soap opera Las trampas del deseo and the second season of Señora de Acero.

Lourdes returned to Mexican melodramas in 2016 with the telenovela Corazón que miente, playing "Rafaela", one of the main antagonists, with Thelma Madrigal, Pablo Lyle, Diego Olivera, Dulce María, and Alejandro Tommasi.

Recently, Lourdes participated with a starring character in the production of Carlos Moreno Laguillo, Mujeres de negro, playing Rita and sharing credits with once again with Mayrín Villanueva, Diego Olivera, Alexis Ayala with Alejandra Barros and Ximena Herrera.

Filmography

Television roles

References

External links 
 
 

Mexican telenovela actresses
Living people
Mexican television actresses
1972 births